Româno-Americană București was a Romanian football club from Bucharest, south-east Romania, founded in 1906 and dissolved soon after, in 1916. It won one Romanian Championship in 1915.

History
Româno-Americană FC was the first football club founded in Ploieşti, in 1906, under the name Societatea Româno-Americană (Romanian-American Society). The foundations were laid by American and Dutch functionaries from the oil companies from the Prahova Valley. In 1914 the club was moved to Bucharest and became champions of Romania at the end of the 1914–15 season.

On 2 December 1907, the club plays its first match, in Bucharest, on the "La Şosea" (By the Road) Field, against Olympia Bucharest, winning 7–1.

Româno-Americană's most important players, among others, were: Clive, Brazier, Llewellyn, Jack Catterall, Hans Horing, Alvirescu.

The club was dissolved in the spring of 1916.

Honours
Liga I:

Winners (1): 1914–15

Association football clubs established in 1906
Association football clubs disestablished in 1916
Football clubs in Bucharest
Defunct football clubs in Romania
History of Bucharest
1906 establishments in Romania
1916 disestablishments in Romania